Konduru  may refer to:

 A. Konduru, a village in A.Konduru mandal, Krishna district, Andhra Pradesh, India
 Konduru, G. Konduru mandal, a village in G.Konduru mandal, Krishna district, Andhra Pradesh, India
 Konduru, Nandigama mandal a village in Nandigama mandal, Krishna district, Andhra Pradesh, India